Quentin Bernard (born 7 July 1989) is a French professional footballer who plays as a left-back for  club Niort.

Career
Born in Poitiers, Bernard started his career with nearby Niort. He joined the club's youth system in 2004, and went on to make more than 200 senior appearances in all competitions for the side between 2008 and 2015. On 29 May 2015, it was announced that Bernard had signed a two-year contract with Dijon, where he joined up with former Niort teammate Johan Gastien.

On 17 January 2023, Bernard returned to Niort.

References

External links

Quentin Bernard profile at foot-national.com

1989 births
Sportspeople from Poitiers
Footballers from Nouvelle-Aquitaine
Living people
French footballers
Association football defenders
Chamois Niortais F.C. players
Dijon FCO players
Stade Brestois 29 players
AJ Auxerre players
Ligue 1 players
Ligue 2 players
Championnat National players
Championnat National 3 players